The Grindavík men's football team is the men's football department of the Ungmennafélag Grindavíkur multi-sport club. It is based in Grindavík in south-west Iceland, and currently plays in the Lengjudeildin, The second tier in Icelandic football.

History
The club won its way slowly up the leagues, beginning in the third tier and spending some time there before promotion to the second tier and at last promotion to the first tier in 1994. The club established itself there, and for years was the only side in the top divisions to have never been relegated from any division. Sigurður Jónsson was appointed manager before the 2006 season, after a successful period at Víkingur. In that season, Grindavík got relegated for the first time in their history. In September 2006 with three rounds to go, Sigurður resigned as a manager and his assistants managers, Magni Fannberg Magnússon and Milan Stefán Jankovic took control. They made a draw against Fimleikafélag Hafnarfjarðar, 1:1, in the last round, but it was clear before the game that they needed to win. On September 22, 2007, Grindavík won a promotion back to the Úrvalsdeild after a 6–0 win over Reynir Sandgerði, with still one round unplayed. They managed to stay in the top league from 2008 until 2012, when they were again relegated to 1. deild for the 2013 season.

In 2017, Grindavík finished 5th in the Úrvalsdeild. Andri Rúnar Bjarnason finished as the league's top goalscorer and was named the player of the season.

Honours
Icelandic League Cup
Winners: 2000

Current squad

References

Football clubs in Iceland
Association football clubs established in 1935
1935 establishments in Iceland
Ungmennafélag Grindavíkur